Mírzá ʻAlí-Muḥammad-i-K͟hurásání (died 1928), known as Ibn-i-Aṣdaq, was an eminent follower of Baháʼu'lláh, the founder of the Baháʼí Faith. He was appointed a Hand of the Cause and identified as one of the nineteen Apostles of Baháʼu'lláh.

Ibn-i-Asdaq was addressed by Baháʼu'lláh as Shahíd Ibn-i-Shahíd (Martyr, son of the Martyr). He was the son of a distinguished martyr of the Bábí movement, and himself requested several times to give his life up for the Baháʼí Cause. The response by Baháʼu'lláh was, "Today, the greatest of all deeds is service to the Cause... This martyrdom is not confined to the destruction of life and the shedding of blood. A person enjoying the bounty of life may yet be recorded a martyr..." (Eminent Baháʼís, p. 172).

In 1920, Ibn-i-Asdaq and Ahmad Yazdani, brought the Tablet to The Hague from ʻAbdu'l-Bahá to the Central Organisation for Durable Peace in The Hague.

Ironically, Ibn-i-Asdaq lived a long life of service, dying in 1928. He was one of the few Apostles to live into the time of Shoghi Effendi as the Guardian.

Background

Family 
As his name implies, Ibn-i-Asdaq was the son of Ismu'lláhu'l-Asdaq of Khurásán, also known as Mullá Sádiq-i-Muqaddas. Mullá Sádiq together with Quddús and Mullá Alí Akbar-i-Ardistání were the first three Bábís known to suffer persecution for their faith on Persian soil. He was also a survivor of the Fort Tabarsi engagement in Mazandaran Province (1848).

Ibn-i-Asdaq's daughter, Ruha Asdaq, later wrote a book about her pilgrimage experiences called One Life One Memory.

Notes

References

Further reading
 Brookshaw, Dominic Parvis (2004). Letters to Bahá'í princesses: Tablets revealed in honour of the women of Ibn-i Asdaq's household. Lights of Irfan, Volume 5, pages 17-40.

Hands of the Cause
Apostles of Baháʼu'lláh
Iranian Bahá'ís
1928 deaths
Year of birth unknown
19th-century Bahá'ís
20th-century Bahá'ís